At least two ships of the Pakistan Navy have been named Aslat:

, a  launched as USS O'Callahan in 1965. She was leased by Pakistan between 1989 and 1994 and renamed Aslat. On her return to the United States Navy in 1994 she was scrapped.
, a  launched in 2011. 

Pakistan Navy ship names